Unagi is the Japanese word for freshwater eels.

Unagi can also mean:

 The original Japanese title of the 1997 film The Eel
 Unagi, a character in the videogame Super Mario 64
 Unagi, a character in the Japanese visual novel Popotan
 Unagi, a character in the animated TV show Avatar: The Last Airbender
 Unagi is the first of a group of five episodes (Unagi, Unagi II, III...) dedicated to the development of a "weaponless fighting technic" by Perceval and Karadoc in the French TV show Kaamelott. 
 Unagi, the codename for the media playback engine derived from Winamp core technologies
 The One with Unagi, the 17th episode of the 6th season of the TV show Friends
Zanshin (referred to by Ross as "Unagi" in that episode) – a state of total awareness.
 Unagi Inc., a company offering electric scooters under their own brand
Lake Unagi is a maar lake in Kyūshū, Japan